Harold Braithwaite Mattingly (1923 – 23 August 2015) was a British historian of Roman civilization, epigrapher and numismatist who was Professor of Ancient History at the University of Leeds.

Biography
Mattingly was born in Finchley, London, the son of the historian and numismatist Harold Mattingly.  He attended The Leys School in Cambridge and took a double first in Classics at Gonville and Caius College, Cambridge in 1948.  He subsequently held a Craven Scholarship from 1948 to 1950, writing a thesis on the Roman Imperial Senate.

He married Erica Stuart (died 2008), an artist and potter, with whom he had had three children, including David Mattingly, Professor of Roman Archaeology at the University of Leicester.

Academic career
In 1950 Mattingly became a Lecturer, later Reader, in Ancient History at the University of Nottingham.  In 1970 he was appointed Professor of Ancient History at the University of Leeds.  His research throughout his career, according to his Leeds obituary,  "focused on Classical Greece and the Roman Republic and on numismatic and epigraphic problems".  He retired from his chair at Leeds in 1987 with the title Emeritus Professor.

Mattingly was President of the Royal Numismatic Society from 1999 to 2004.

Death
Professor Mattingly died on 23 August 2015, aged 92.

Publications
 2012 - Coins and travels in Greece : an introduction to the coins of ancient Greece with reminiscences of visits by numismatist Harold Mattingly (with Joanna Mattingly and Stephen Tyrrell)
 2007 - From coins to history : selected numismatic studies  
 1996 - The Athenian empire restored : epigraphic and historical studies
 1969 - Notes on some Roman republican moneyers
 1963 - Various numismatic notes 
 1960 - Naevius and the Metelli

References

External links
 Obituary in Coins Weekly
 Harold B. Mattingly on worldcat.org

1923 births
2015 deaths
People educated at The Leys School
Alumni of Gonville and Caius College, Cambridge
British historians
British numismatists
Presidents of the Royal Numismatic Society
Academics of the University of Nottingham
Academics of the University of Leeds